John Alexander Robinson (June 29, 1867 – April 1929) was a Scottish-born educator, journalist and political figure in Newfoundland. He represented Trinity Bay in the Newfoundland and Labrador House of Assembly from 1898 to 1900.

He was born in Glasgow and came to Newfoundland in 1882. For a time, Robinson was a grammar school principal in Carbonear. He founded the Newfoundland Teachers' Association and served as its president. Robinson was founder and editor of the St. John's Daily News. He served in the Legislative Council of Newfoundland from 1897 to 1898, from 1909 to 1919 and from 1926 to 1929. He was a member of the Executive Council serving as colonial secretary from 1898 to 1900, as Minister of Posts and Telegraphs from 1916 to 1919 and as a minister without portfolio in 1924 and 1928. Robinson was defeated when he ran for election to the Newfoundland assembly in 1900, 1904 and 1908 running as a Conservative and then as a member of the Newfoundland People's Party.

In 1883, Robinson married Flora Taylor.

References 
 

Members of the Legislative Council of Newfoundland
Members of the Newfoundland and Labrador House of Assembly
1867 births
1929 deaths
Journalists from Newfoundland and Labrador
Scottish emigrants to pre-Confederation Newfoundland
Newfoundland Colony people
Government ministers of the Dominion of Newfoundland
Colonial Secretaries of Newfoundland
Newfoundland People's Party politicians